Idea Girl is a 1946 American comedy film directed by Will Jason and written by Charles R. Marion and Elwood Ullman. The film stars Jess Barker, Julie Bishop, Alan Mowbray, George Dolenz, Joan Shawlee and Laura Deane Dutton. The film was released on February 8, 1946, by Universal Pictures.

Plot

Cast        
Jess Barker as Larry Brewster
Julie Bishop as Pat O'Rourke
Alan Mowbray as J.C. Crow
George Dolenz as Wilfred Potts
Joan Shawlee as Mabel
Laura Deane Dutton as Cynthia Winters
Arthur Q. Bryan as P.J. Maple
Sarah Padden as Old lady 
Ruth Lee as Abigail Hawthorne
Virginia Christine as Evelina
Maurice Cass as Arturo Coveleski
Barton Yarborough as Pete Barlow 
Charlie Barnet as Orchestra Leader

References

External links
 

1946 films
American comedy films
1946 comedy films
Universal Pictures films
Films directed by Will Jason
American black-and-white films
1940s English-language films
1940s American films